Goldmine may refer to:

 A location where gold mining takes place
 Goldmine (magazine), a music collectibles magazine
 Goldmine, a 2007 album by Silvía Night
 Goldmine (Gabby Barrett album), 2020
 Goldmine (Silvía Night album), 2007
 "Goldmine" (George Fox song), 1989
 "Goldmine" (Kimbra song), 2015

See also
 Gold Mine (disambiguation)
 Gold farming, acquiring virtual currency in online games to be sold to other players for real money